Apalachee is an unincorporated community in Morgan County, in the U.S. state of Georgia. Apalachee was one of the earliest settlements in Morgan County.

History
The community was named after the Apalachee Indians. The first settlers arrived in Apalachee around 1820, making it one of the oldest communities in Morgan County. A post office called Apalachee was established in 1889, and remained in operation until 1957. By 1900, the community had 47 inhabitants. The Georgia General Assembly incorporated Apalachee as a town in 1907.

Decline 
The town was officially dissolved in 1995. Few buildings still exist today.

See also
List of ghost towns in Georgia

References

Unincorporated communities in Morgan County, Georgia
Unincorporated communities in Georgia (U.S. state)